MEMZ is a brand of vehicle engines related to Melitopol Engine Factory (literally "Melitopol Motor Plant" ), which is located in Melitopol, Zaporizhzhia Oblast and it is a part of AvtoZAZ motor vehicle manufacturer out of Zaporizhzhia.

The factory was founded in 1908 by a Ukrainian Mennonite entrepreneur Izrail Davidovich Zaferman, intending to build diesel engines. After the October Revolution, it was nationalized, and until 1925 operated as the Russian Second Soviet Factory. It was renamed into the artel Pobeda (Victory) in 1925 and was focused mainly on diesel engine for applications in agricultural and construction machinery, and for fishing boats. In 1931, the factory was included to the state owned combinat Soyuzdiesel, focusing on engines for fishing boats. In 1936, it was again renamed, to Mikoyan Diesel-Building Factory. It was evacuated prior to the German invasion, and rebuilt, restarting production in 1944. In 1958, the name was changed again, to Melitopol Motor Plant (MeMZ), when it was refitted for production of automobile engines.

Post-war
The large industrial city of Melitopol was freed from Nazi occupation in 1944, at which time the National Committee of USSR ordered the factory to resume operations.

In 1958 the factory was renamed MeMZ and started developing micro car engines for ZAZ. In 1960, MeMZ released its first gasoline engine, the  V4 MeMZ-965, which had been designed for the LuAZ-967. It had a magnesium block, oil cooler on the rear of the engine, and accessories mounted high on the engine. Despite being small, the engine produced a great deal of heat, all of which could not be effectively dissipated by an air-cooling system. In 1963 the initial design saw some improvements and the new MeMZ-966 model was released into mass production.

The factory was incorporated into AvtoZAZ holding in 1975.

MeMZ-966 engine

The MeMZ-966 was an economy model; underpowered, but quite cheap to produce. As a result, it was implemented  in what the Soviet government hoped would be the first "National" vehicle; the ZAZ (often referred to as Zaporozhets) - short for Zaporozhia Automotive Factory. The ZAZ model-line cars were intended to be affordable; therefore they were neither safe nor reliable; nevertheless they were a success since people would rather have some means of transportation as opposed to none at all. MeMZ continued to upgrade its engines, which eventually found uses in other vehicles.

The engine looks a bit like the VW air-cooled boxer four, except that the two cylinder banks are at a 90-degree angle. As Soviet car owners were expected to do much of the servicing themselves, and auto workshops were in short supply anyway, this layout was more practical.

Merger
With the establishment of AutoZAZ-Daewoo in 1998, the factory was renamed AutoZAZ-Motor,  and then incorporated into the ZAZ in 2002.

Engine models 

MeMZ 307/3071 are fuel injected versions of 301/3011

See also
 ZAZ
 Zaporozhets
 OHV
 Air cooling

References

External links

 http://www.memz.com.ua  - Official site

Engine manufacturers of Ukraine
Engine manufacturers of the Soviet Union
Motor vehicle engine manufacturers
Companies nationalised by the Soviet Union